A Long Time Ago may refer to:

 "A Long Time Ago" (song)
 A Long Time Ago (album)